The Great Plain of the Koukdjuak is located in the Qikiqtaaluk Region, Nunavut within the Canadian Arctic. It is the namesake of the Koukdjuak River in western Baffin Island on the southeastern coast of Foxe Basin. It stretches from Cory Bay to Hantzsch Bay, and then inland.

Geography
Its tundra covers clay soils, limestone and shale bedrock.

Fauna
It is notable for migratory bird and wildlife (Barren-ground caribou crossing) habitat. The plain supports the largest goose colony in the world. It is a breeding ground or habitat for lesser snow geese, Canada geese, long-tailed ducks, king eider, common eider, and Atlantic brant. It is a natural habitat for shorebirds, such as the red phalarope. It is classified as an Important Bird Area, an International Biological Program designated site and a Key Habitat Site.

Conservation status
 Dewey Soper Migratory Bird Sanctuary (federal)
 Ramsar Site (Wetland of International Significance)
 Bowman Bay Wildlife Sanctuary

References

External links
 Map

Foxe Basin
Landforms of Baffin Island
Wetlands of Qikiqtaaluk Region
Natural history of Nunavut
Ramsar sites in Qikiqtaaluk Region
Important Bird Areas of Qikiqtaaluk Region
Plains of Qikiqtaaluk Region
Important Bird Areas of Arctic islands